Eric Schreurs (15 September 1958 in Leiden – 29 May 2020 in Leiden) was a Dutch cartoonist. He was the winner of the 2002 Stripschapprijs. He is most famous for his long-running humor comics series Joop Klepzeiker, which had satirical elements. Later in his career he was also active as a painter.  His son Boris is a drag queen known as My Little Puny, who competed on season two of Drag Race Holland, placing as the runner-up of the season.

References

External links
 Lambiek Comiclopedia article.

1958 births
2020 deaths
Dutch cartoonists
Dutch comics artists
Dutch humorists
Dutch satirists
20th-century Dutch painters
21st-century Dutch painters
Artists from Leiden
Winners of the Stripschapsprijs